Isanthrene is a genus of moths in the subfamily Arctiinae. The genus was erected by Jacob Hübner in 1819.

Species
Isanthrene aterrima (Walker, [1865]) 
Isanthrene azia (Druce, 1884) 
Isanthrene basifera Walker, [1865] 
Isanthrene championi Druce, 1884 
Isanthrene crabroniformis Staudinger, 1876 
Isanthrene echemon Druce, 1884 
Isanthrene felderi (Druce, 1883) 
Isanthrene incendiaria (Hübner, [1813]) 
Isanthrene melas (Cramer, [1775]) 
Isanthrene minor (Butler, 1876) 
Isanthrene monticola (Schaus, 1911) 
Isanthrene notipennis (Butler, 1876) 
Isanthrene pelor (Druce, 1897) 
Isanthrene pentagona Schaus, 1898 
Isanthrene perbosci (Guérin-Méneville, [1844]) 
Isanthrene pertyi (Herrich-Schäffer, [1854]) 
Isanthrene porphyria (Walker, 1854) 
Isanthrene profusa Hampson, 1898 
Isanthrene pyrocera Hampson, 1898 
Isanthrene thyestes Druce, 1883 
Isanthrene ustrina Hübner, 1824 
Isanthrene varia (Walker, 1854) 
Isanthrene vespiformis (Butler, 1876)

References

Euchromiina
Moth genera